Wu Yiqiang (born July 1967) is a Chinese material engineer who is a professor and former vice president of Central South University of Forestry and Technology, and an academician of the Chinese Academy of Engineering.

Biography 
Wu was born in Gushi County, Henan, in July 1967. After graduating from Central South University of Forestry and Technology in 1991, he stayed at the university, where he moved up the ranks to become vice-president in May 2016. He earned his doctor's degree from Ehime University in 2005.

Honours and awards 
 2010 State Science and Technology Progress Award (Second Class)
 2018 State Science and Technology Progress Award (Second Class)
 18 November 2021 Member of the Chinese Academy of Engineering (CAE)

References 

1967 births
Living people
People from Gushi County
Engineers from Henan
Central South University of Forestry and Technology alumni
Academic staff of Central South University of Forestry and Technology
Members of the Chinese Academy of Engineering